We Are Pirates is a 2015 American novel written by Daniel Handler.

Plot

Gwen, a young teen, puts together a ship's crew and heads out to sea to be 21st-century pirates violently terrorizing the San Francisco Bay.

References

External links
New York Times review of ''We Are Pirates
Bloomsbury Publishing

Novels by Daniel Handler
2015 American novels
American comedy novels
Bloomsbury Publishing books
Novels set in the San Francisco Bay Area
Novels about pirates